Hugh Stuart Jones is a British historian, currently Professor of Intellectual History at the University of Manchester. He was born in West Yorkshire and educated at the Queen Elizabeth Grammar School, Wakefield, and at St Catherine's College, Oxford, where he took a First in Modern History in 1983 and won the University's Gladstone Memorial Prize. He took his DPhil at Nuffield College, where he also held a Research Fellowship (1986-8). After teaching for two years at New College, he moved to Manchester in 1990. He was head of the History Department from 2000 to 2003.

Stuart Jones is best known for his work on French and British political thought of the nineteenth and twentieth centuries, on the intellectual history of Victorian Britain, and on the history of universities. He is a notable authority on the intellectual history of liberalism. He was a Visiting Fellow of All Souls College, Oxford, in 2008–9.

Publications 
 The French State in Question: Public Law and Political Argument in the Third Republic (1993)
 (ed) Auguste Comte: Early Political Writings (1998)
 Victorian Political Thought (2000)
 Intellect and Character in Victorian England: Mark Pattison and the Invention of the Don (2007)

References 

British historians
Historians of France
People educated at Queen Elizabeth Grammar School, Wakefield
Alumni of St Catherine's College, Oxford
Fellows of New College, Oxford
Living people
Alumni of Nuffield College, Oxford
Year of birth missing (living people)